Sara Rachele (born 1988) is an American folk singer from Decatur, Georgia.

Early life 
The daughter of a baby-boomer painter and Italian-Croatian American immigrant, Rachele (pronounced ra-kelly) grew up in Decatur, GA.

Music career 
As a teen working for free cleaning out the cupboards at Atlanta acoustic venue Eddie's Attic, Rachele met musicians and writers, joining bands as a side-player. There Rachele met Hope Partlow, and dropped her college plans for a music career, although she eventually completed a degree at Berklee College of Music. The wurlitzer player of The Love Willows (Decca/Universal) returned to her hometown to track her first LP, Diamond Street, with bandmate and producer and guitarist of Ponderosa, Kris Sampson (New West Records.) Released on Angrygal Records, the album and her follow up 7-inch vinyl singles received acclaim in American Songwriter, Paste Magazine, and single "Don't Give Me Hell (feat. J. Thomas Hall)," (Normaltown Records) hit AAA, Americana, and Sirius XM charts. Her follow up cover of Cracker's "Low," produced by Nick Whitson, and dubbed "sublime," by Spin Magazine, pushed her into the mainstream alternative formats.

Rachele is currently writing and recording her sophomore solo LP, and lives with her dog, Hank Williams Sr. and her cat, Tom Selleck, splitting time between East Atlanta Village of Atlanta Georgia, and New York, New York's East Village.

References

External links
 https://sararachele.bandcamp.com/

Living people
People from Decatur, Georgia
Berklee College of Music alumni
1988 births